Jolanta Bebel (née Rzymowska; born 4 December 1950) is a Polish fencer. She competed in the women's team foil events at the 1972 and 1976 Summer Olympics.

Personal life
On September 11, 1971, she married Bronisław Bebel, a volleyball player and 1976 Olympic Champion.

References

1950 births
Living people
Polish female fencers
Olympic fencers of Poland
Fencers at the 1972 Summer Olympics
Fencers at the 1976 Summer Olympics
Fencers from Warsaw
20th-century Polish women